Belford railway station is a disused station situated on the East Coast Main Line between the current Chathill and Berwick-upon-Tweed stations serving the village of Belford. It opened on 29 March 1847, closing on  29 January 1968. Today only the northbound station building remains.

After a 2010 plan to rebuild the station did not proceed, in 2015, Berwick Town Council allocated £100,000 to investigate reopening the station. As part of this campaign they have proposed that the former station at Belford should be reopened so as to improve public transport access to the Northumberland Coast and St Cuthbert's Way.

In March 2020, a bid was made to the Restoring Your Railway fund to get funds for a feasibility study into reinstating the station. This bid was unsuccessful.

References

External links

Disused railway stations in Northumberland
Railway stations in Great Britain opened in 1847
Railway stations in Great Britain closed in 1968
Former North Eastern Railway (UK) stations
John and Benjamin Green buildings and structures
Belford, Northumberland